Sainte Barbe is French for Saint Barbara.

Sainte-Barbe or variations may refer to:

Places

France
 Sainte-Barbe, Moselle, in the Moselle département
 Sainte-Barbe, Vosges, in the Vosges département 
 Sainte-Barbe-sur-Gaillon, in the Eure département

Canada
Sainte-Barbe, Quebec 
St. Barbe, Newfoundland and Labrador

People
 Sir John St Barbe, 1st Baronet (1655-1723)
 John St Barbe (1742-1816) was a prominent English shipbroker and shipowner 
 Richard St. Barbe Baker (1889-1992) British forester
 Ursula St Barbe (died 1602), lady at the court of Queen Elizabeth I of England. 
 William de Ste Barbe (died 1152) Bishop of Durham, from Saint-Barbe-en-Auge

Other uses
 Collège Sainte-Barbe, a former school in Paris, France
 Sainte-Barbe Library, Paris, France
 St Barbe Museum & Art Gallery, Lymington, UK
 Saint-Barbe-en-Auge, a priory in Normandy, France

See also
 Île Barbe on the Saône, in Lyon, France
 Barbe (disambiguation)
 Barb (disambiguation)
 St. Barb's, a town in Trinidad